The Katholieke Universiteit Leuven associatie Kortrijk (Catholic University of Leuven Campus Kortrijk), or short Kulak is a university satellite campus of the KU Leuven  in the city of Kortrijk (Courtrai) in the Belgian province of West Flanders and therefore also is officially a Dutch-speaking institution.

Background 
As the name implies, it is a university campus affiliated with the Katholieke Universiteit Leuven situated on the southern rim of Kortrijk. The idea behind this campus 50 years ago was twofold, but was embedded in the general movement for more democratisation of the higher education. First of all, Leuven always had a strong portion of its students coming from the West Flanders region. Yet, many prospective students were wary of moving to Flemish Brabant for an adventure that would involve an almost complete rupture with their familiar surroundings. (The area is also known for its student bars, which may cause trepidation in parents). Secondly, the majority of students who quit university do so in their first year. Typically, depending on the studies, the first two years (which give a general but thorough introduction into the whole scope of the subject) draw two to three times as many students as the last three or four (in which the student specializes in one specific field of his subject).

By giving their West-Flemish students the possibility to complete their first two to three years in Kortrijk, the Katholieke Universiteit Leuven (KU Leuven) offers them a smaller, easier to manage environment, where teaching is done in smaller groups allowing closer interaction with academic staff. Leuven also benefits as more students in Kortrijk means lesser students in the chronically overcrowded first year lectures in Leuven. Students that have completed the first two to three bachelor years will still move to Leuven (or to any other university, for that matter) to specialize further in their master years but by then they will be more mature, confident and up to the challenge.

All Kulak campus faculty buildings, research facilities, student dormitories, restaurant and social areas are within a single university park, allowing for a true campus life. located on a shallow hill in the "t'Hoge" (the heights) region just south of the city centre of Kortrijk. About half of the students live either in the university dormitory or in a rented room nearby. The other half lives with their family in the greater Kortrijk region, close enough to commute (even by bike) to the university.

History

Beginning 
The first academic year started at the KULAK in 1965. Initially, the courses took place in het 'Vormingsinstituut' for SME's, located at the Hoog-Kortrijk area. The first student administration centre was situated in the King Albert Street, in the city centre of Kortrijk. Later, the 'Guesthouse', known as a meeting and lodgingplace for foreign researchers and guest professors, was opened.

Courses 
From the founding of the university campus till now, the diversity of programmes offered has been steadily increasing. In 1965, the Kulak started with "Arts and Philosophy" ('Letteren en Wijsbegeerte') (including Law). Six years later, in 1971, the "Medical faculty" and the "Science Faculty" (including Mathematics, Physics and Chemistry) were founded. 
From 1984 onwards, students could enroll in the "Informatics" (ITC) programme, from 1985 in the "Pharmacy" courses and from 1986 in the "Biology" and "Bio-Engineering" courses. In the academic year 1991-1992, the "Economics" department started ('Toegepaste Economische Wetenschappen'), and from 2004 onwards the "Education Studies" programme is offered.

Building Phases 
In 1970, the StuHu was built: a student home containing a restaurant, a meeting room and several living units. In 1971, the 'Groene Mote' (or the 'dorm') was finished. That same year, the faculty or Arts and Philosophy was opened (currently Building A). Building E, housing the Medical faculty and the Interdisciplinary Research Centrum (IRC) was inaugurated in 1973 and 1975.

In 1982, a new expansion phase started which comprised the building of a 'student village', of a new Library and of the Faculty of Science and administration buildings.

In the early 1990s, the new Building B, designed by architect Stéphane Beel, was opened.

In 2007 a new enlargement phase started. This phase consisted in the construction of a new student residence, named 'Corona', to house 81 students and a new building, Building C. Also, the long corridor between Buildings A and B, the so-called "Spina", was extended until the Building E.  Soon followed by an expansion of the Interdisciplinary Research Facility - Life Sciences.

In 2017 the student residence 'Groene Mote' was closed down and replaced by a new one named 'Spoelberg' offering accommodation for 103 students.

In the same period the buildings on campus, previously hosting the Innovation and Incubation Centre Kortrijk (IICK) were acquired by KU Leuven, and now are an integral part of the campus.

Campus rectors 
Throughout the years, the Kortrijk University has known several campus rectors:

 1971 - 1991: Mgr Guido Maertens
 1991 - 1992: Frans Van Cauwelaert
 1992 - 1996: Vic Nachtergaele
 1996 - 2001: Marcel Joniau
 2001 - 2009: Piet Vanden Abeele
 2009 - 2013: Jan Beirlant
 2013 - 2017: Marc Depaepe
 2017 - now: Piet Desmet

Faculties 

Faculty of Arts
History
leading to History or Political Sciences
Linguistics and Literature
leading to Linguistics and Literature or Communication Sciences
Faculty of Business and Economics
Applied Economics 
leading to Applied Economics or Business Engineering 
Faculty of Law
Law
leading to Law or Political Sciences
Faculty of Medicine
Medicine
Biomedical Sciences
Faculty of Psychology and Educational Sciences
Education Studies 
leading to Psychology, Pedagogical Sciences or Educational Studies
Science, Engineering and Technology Group 
Mathematics 
leading to a Bachelor of Sciences in Mathematics or a Bachelor of Sciences in Engineering (at Leuven, main campus)
Informatics 
leading to a Bachelor of Sciences in Informatics
Physics 
leading to a Bachelor of Sciences in Physics or a Bachelor of Sciences in Engineering (at Leuven, main campus)
Chemistry 
leading to a Bachelor of Sciences in Chemistry (including an option towards Biochemistry and Biotechnology), a Bachelor of Science in Pharmacy (at Leuven, main campus), or a Bachelor of science in Bio-Engineering (at Leuven, main campus)
Biology 
leading to a Bachelor of Sciences in Biology (including an option towards Biochemistry and Biotechnology)

Buildings 

The Kortrijk University Campus is located in the 'Etienne Sabbelaan' in the Hoog-Kortrijk area.
The campus consists of several buildings, which are all connected by a 120-meter long corridor: the 'Spina'.

 Building A
 Welcome Desk
 Student Administration
 Central hal
 Faculty of Arts
 Faculty of Law
 Faculty of Psychology and Educational Sciences
 Faculty of Science
 Campus Library
 Rectorat

 Building B
 Faculty Business and Economics
 Postacademic Education (PAV)
 Building C
 Faculty Educational Science (Onderwijskunde)
 Building E
 Faculty of Medicine & Biomedical Sciences
 Interdisciplinary Research Facility - Life Sciences
 Incubation and Innovation Centre Kortrijk (IICK)
 Students centre
 Student House with restaurant, bar and social event area
 Faculty Club restaurant

Student Dormitories 
 De Groene Mote  (closed)
 Students Village
 Corona
 Spoelberg

Trivia 
The Kortrijk University houses the "Library of the French Netherlands (French: Pays-Bas français; Dutch: Franse Nederlanden)", containing a collection regarding the literature and history of the French Netherlands, and an "Archive French Netherlands" containing documents about the regionalist movements in Northern France.

External links 

 More information about higher education in Flanders/Belgium (in English)
 Find an officially recognised programme of this institution in the Higher Education Register
 Website of KU Leuven Campus Kortrijk (KULAK)
 Studentswebsite KU Leuven Campus Kortrijk

Notes and references

KU Leuven
Catholic universities and colleges in Belgium
Buildings and structures in Kortrijk